The Tasmanian Government Railways Q class was a class of 4-8-2 steam locomotives operated by the Tasmanian Government Railways.

History
In 1922/23, the Tasmanian Government Railways took delivery of six 4-8-2 locomotives from Perry Engineering, Gawler followed by a further three in 1929 from Walkers Limited, Maryborough. Between 1936 and 1945, a further 20 were built by Clyde Engineering, Sydney. The final four were delivered with higher pressure boilers.

They operated on the Western, Derwent Valley, Main and Fingal lines. Following the arrival of the X class, they began to operate suburban passenger services in Hobart. The first was withdrawn in 1957 with the final examples withdrawn in January 1964 following the Y class entering service. Q5 has been preserved at the Tasmanian Transport Museum, Glenorchy.

References

Clyde Engineering locomotives
Railway locomotives introduced in 1922
Steam locomotives of Tasmania
Walkers Limited locomotives
3 ft 6 in gauge locomotives of Australia
4-8-2 locomotives